Crassispira fuscocincta is a species of sea snail, a marine gastropod mollusk in the family Pseudomelatomidae.

Description
The length of the shell attains 10.5 mm, its diameter 4.5 mm.

(Original description) The shell has an elevate pyramidal shape. The shell contains 7-8 whorls, not convex and with the suture not impressed. The color of the shell pale is yellowish white with a sutural line of brown, anteriorly wax yellow with revolving lines of yellowish white, with a spiral series of large smooth well-rounded nodules on slightly elevated wide ridges on the lower half of the whorls; anteriorly with a few spiral raised lines. The apex is acute. The spire shows a rectilineal outline. The aperture is rather wide. The siphonal canal is very short.

Distribution
This marine species occurs in the Caribbean Sea off Jamaica and the ABC Islands

References

 Fallon P.J. (2011) Descriptions and illustrations of some new and poorly known turrids (Turridae) of the tropical northwestern Atlantic. Part 2. Genus Crassispira Swainson, 1840, subgenera Monilispira Bartsch & Rehder, 1939 and Dallspira Bartsch, 1950. The Nautilus 125(1): 15-28

External links
 
 
 De Jong K.M. & Coomans H.E. (1988) Marine gastropods from Curaçao, Aruba and Bonaire. Leiden: E.J. Brill. 261 pp. 

fuscocincta
Gastropods described in 1850